Rhyzodiastes propinquus is a species of ground beetle in the subfamily Rhysodinae. It was described by R.T. & J.R. Bell in 1985. It is found on the Nicobar Islands (India).

References

Rhyzodiastes
Beetles of Asia
Fauna of the Andaman and Nicobar Islands
Beetles described in 1985